Camp Island may refer to:

Camp Island (Nunavut), an arctic island in Canada
Camp Island (Western Australia), an island in the Lyons River